Ross Brown is a Green politician in Northern Ireland. He was elected as a shadow councillor to Belfast City Council in the 2014 election, and also stood as the party's candidate in the European Parliament election, 2014.

He has an Economics degree from Queen's University Belfast and an American business qualification from Saint Anselm College in New Hampshire.

References 

Year of birth missing (living people)
Living people
Members of Belfast City Council
Green Party in Northern Ireland politicians
Alumni of Queen's University Belfast